Girls is the first solo album released by Eric Stewart in 1980. It was the soundtrack to the film Girls.

Overview
The album is half instrumental and was mostly co-written by Eric Stewart and then 10cc keyboardist Duncan Mackay. It was recorded during the time of recording of the 10cc's seventh studio album Look Hear? and features contributions from all of the other then 10cc members. The song "Make the Pieces Fit" was originally intended for Look Hear? but was eventually included on Girls. An alternate version of the song "Make the Pieces Fit" was later included on the Stewart's next solo album Frooty Rooties.

"Girls" and "Warm, Warm, Warm" were released as singles. Neither the album nor the singles managed to chart in the Stewart's native UK, however the album charted in Norway.

Track listing
All tracks written by Eric Stewart and Duncan Mackay except where noted

"Girls Opening Music" - 3:28
"Girls" (Stewart) - 3:18
"Disco Grindin'" - 2:09
"Switch le Bitch" - 4:26
"Aural Exciter" - 1:44
"Warm, Warm, Warm" (Stewart) - 3:40
"Tonight" - 3:43
"Snatch the Gas" - 2:01
"Your Touch is Soft" - 2:15
"Trouble Shared" - 2:19
"Discollapse" - 3:23
"Make the Pieces Fit" (Stewart) - 4:09

Personnel
Eric Stewart - vocals, guitar, bass, keyboards, grand piano, Fender Rhodes, Moog strings, percussion, Clavinet, synthesizer, rhythm box, handclaps, backing vocals, Aural Exciter
Duncan Mackay - grand piano, Yahama CS80, Taurus bass pedals, Clavinet, sequencers, synthesizers, pianet, Yamaha Brass CS80, Fender Rhodes, handclaps, Roland Vocoder Strings, choir (except "Girls", "Warm, Warm, Warm" and "Make the Pieces Fit")
Paul Burgess - drums, percussion, handclaps, congas, maracas (except "Tonight", "Snatch The Gas", "Your Touch Is Soft" and "Trouble Shared")
Rick Fenn - guitar solo on "Girls", lead guitar "Make the Pieces Fit"
Graham Gouldman - acoustic guitars, autoharp on "Make the Pieces Fit"
Stuart Tosh - drums on "Snatch the Gas"
Simon Phillips - drums on "Tonight"
Alan Jones - bass on "Tonight"

Charts

References

1980 debut albums
Eric Stewart albums
Polydor Records albums
Albums produced by Eric Stewart